Waveland is a town in Brown Township, Montgomery County, in the U.S. state of Indiana. The population was 420 at the 2010 census.

History
Waveland was platted by John Milligan in 1835. The settlement began as a resting place at a good spring between Terre Haute and Lafayette, Indiana. After a trading post and post office were established, Milligan developed the surrounding property. By 1850, the town had three general stores, three churches, two inns, two wagon shops and a blacksmith.
Waveland was the boyhood home of American Impressionist T. C. Steele. His parents, Samuel and Harriett, moved to the thriving settlement when Steele was five years old, around 1852. Steele's father rented a saddle shop from John Milligan. Young Steele was enrolled in the outstanding Waveland Academy. The Presbyterian Church had recognized the need for higher learning in this community and provided a new brick building for the education of children. Steele family records show that, until 1870, they owned the cottage at 110 Cross Street in Waveland, built on one of Milligan's lots.

The George Seybold House and T.C. Steele Boyhood Home are listed on the National Register of Historic Places.

Geography

Climate
The climate in this area is characterized by hot, humid summers and generally mild to cool winters.  According to the Köppen Climate Classification system, Waveland has a humid subtropical climate, abbreviated "Cfa" on climate maps.

Demographics

2010 census
As of the census of 2010, there were 420 people, 169 households, and 118 families living in the town. The racial makeup of the town was 98.1% White, 0.2% Native American, and 1.7% from two or more races. Hispanic or Latino of any race were 2.6% of the population.

There were 169 households, of which 35.5% had children under the age of 18 living with them, 52.7% were married couples living together, 13.0% had a female householder with no husband present, 4.1% had a male householder with no wife present, and 30.2% were non-families. 24.9% of all households were made up of individuals, and 19.5% had someone living alone who was 65 years of age or older. The average household size was 2.49 and the average family size was 2.93.

The median age in the town was 36.8 years. 27.1% of residents were under the age of 18; 6.6% were between the ages of 18 and 24; 23.4% were from 25 to 44; 23.6% were from 45 to 64; and 19.3% were 65 years of age or older. The gender makeup of the town was 48.1% male and 51.9% female.

2000 census
As of the census of 2000, there were 416 people, 168 households, and 115 families living in the town. The racial makeup of the town was 97.36% White, 2.16% from other races, and 0.48% from two or more races. Hispanic or Latino of any race were 1.44% of the population.

There were 168 households, out of which 34.5% had children under the age of 18 living with them, 56.5% were married couples living together, 5.4% had a female householder with no husband present, and 31.5% were non-families. 28.0% of all households were made up of individuals, and 16.1% had someone living alone who was 65 years of age or older. The average household size was 2.48 and the average family size was 3.01.

In the town, the population was spread out, with 26.4% under the age of 18, 7.7% from 18 to 24, 29.6% from 25 to 44, 18.0% from 45 to 64, and 18.3% who were 65 years of age or older. The median age was 36 years. For every 100 females, there were 98.1 males. For every 100 females age 18 and over, there were 91.3 males.

The median income for a household in the town was $43,036, and the median income for a family was $46,250. Males had a median income of $37,250 versus $23,125 for females. The per capita income for the town was $17,970. About 1.6% of families and 2.9% of the population were below the poverty line, including 6.0% of those under age 18 and none of those age 65 or over.

Government
The town is governed by an elected five-chair town board which oversees the finances, ordinances, and other business of the town and park.  The town clerk is also elected.  The town employs a town marshal and his deputies who are responsible for law enforcement services in the town and at the lake and park outside of town known as "Lake Waveland" near the Parke/Montgomery County line.

Education
South Montgomery Community School Corporation operates public schools serving Waveland. Southmont Junior High School and Southmont High School serve secondary students.

The town has a lending library, the Waveland-Brown Township Public Library.

References

Towns in Montgomery County, Indiana
Towns in Indiana